Long Pine Creek is a  long fourth-order tributary to the Niobrara River in Rock and Brown Counties, Nebraska.

Watershed

See also

List of rivers of Nebraska

References

Rivers of Rock County, Nebraska
Rivers of Brown County, Nebraska
Rivers of Nebraska